is a song by Japanese singer-songwriters Rina Aiuchi and U-ka Saegusa. It was released on 14 June 2006 through Giza Studio, for the soundtrack of the Japanese animated television series Case Closed, for which the singers formed a special duo, Rina Aiuchi & U-ka Saegusa. The single reached number eight in Japan and has sold over 29,975 copies nationwide. The Japanese idol group, Sparkling Point were credited as the backing vocals for the song.

Track listing

Charts

Certification and sales

|-
! scope="row"| Japan (RIAJ)
| 
| 29,975 
|-
|}

Release history

References

2006 singles
2006 songs
J-pop songs
Song recordings produced by Daiko Nagato
Songs written by Rina Aiuchi